Nephelodes is a genus of moths of the family Noctuidae.

Selected species
 Nephelodes adusta Buckett, 1972, [1973]
 Nephelodes carminata (Smith, 1890)
 Nephelodes carminea Dognin, 1912
 Nephelodes demaculata Barnes & McDunnough, 1918
 Nephelodes mendica Barnes & Lindsey, 1921
 Nephelodes minians - Bronzed Cutworm or Shaded Umber Moth Guenée, 1852

References
Natural History Museum Lepidoptera genus database
Nephelodes at funet

Hadeninae